FC Ak-Maral Tokmok was a Kyrgyzstani football club based in Tokmok, Kyrgyzstan that played in the top division in Kyrgyzstan, the Kyrgyzstan League.

History 
1992: Founded as FC Spartak Tokmok.
1993: Renamed FC Ak-Maral Tokmok.
1995: Dissolved.

Achievements 
Kyrgyzstan League:
Runner-up: 1993

Kyrgyzstan Cup:
Winner: 1994

External links 
Career stats by KLISF

Football clubs in Kyrgyzstan
1992 establishments in Kyrgyzstan
1995 disestablishments in Kyrgyzstan